Cody Lundin  (born March 15, 1967) is a survival instructor at the Aboriginal Living Skills School in Prescott, Arizona, which he founded in 1991. There he teaches modern wilderness survival skills, primitive living skills, urban preparedness, and homesteading. Lundin was also a former co-host of Discovery Channel's reality television series, Dual Survival.

Lundin is an only child whose father was in the military. He spent his early childhood moving around until finally settling in Laramie, Wyoming, where he attended junior high and high school. After graduating from high school he lived on the streets, in a commune, in the backyards of friends, and then in a brush shelter while he attended college in Prescott, Arizona. Lundin holds a B.A. in Depth Psychology and Holistic Health from Prescott College.

Lundin is the author of two books on survival and preparedness: 98.6 Degrees: The Art of Keeping Your Ass Alive and When All Hell Breaks Loose: Stuff You Need to Survive When Disaster Strikes. Lundin has also provided a foreword for Steve Hart's Citizen Survivor's Handbook, a parody of British wartime propaganda focusing on the importance of psychological endurance in times of crisis.

In 2004, Lundin hosted the Discovery Channel show, Lost in the Wild.

Lundin was a co-host of the television series Dual Survival from 2010 until 2014. On the show, Lundin demonstrated various survival skills while wearing shorts in all weather and going barefoot. On February 17, 2014 Lundin announced on his Facebook page and on his website that he had been fired from the series due to differences of opinion on matters of safety. 

Lundin says that he lives off-the-grid in a self-designed, passive solar earth home in the high-desert wilderness of northern Arizona, collecting rainwater, composting waste, and paying nothing for utilities.

Bibliography

See also
 Dave Canterbury

References

External links
 Cody Lundin.com official website

Living people
Survivalists
American television personalities
Place of birth missing (living people)
Prescott College alumni
1967 births